This page is a list of television programs based on video games, technically both computer and console games based on. The Witcher and its spinoff The Witcher: Blood Origin were not included as a basis of video game adaptation due to being adapted from novels.

According to review-aggregation website Rotten Tomatoes, only nine video game television series had a "fresh" (60% or above) from 2017 to 2023: Castlevania (2017), Carmen Sandiego (2019), Dragon's Dogma (2020), Arcane (2021), Cyberpunk: Edgerunners, Halo, Sonic Prime, and The Cuphead Show! (all in 2022), and The Last of Us (2023); with Arcane, Carmen Sandiego, Castlevania, Cyberpunk: Edgerunners, and The Last of Us received universal acclaim and garnered over 90% of approval ratings, having considered five of the best video game adaptations ever made. This result for Arcane and Cyberpunk: Edgerunners have won multiple awards from nominations including; Annie Award for Best General Audience Animated Television/Broadcast Production, Primetime Emmy Award for Outstanding Animated Program, and The Game Award for Best Adaptation for the former; 7th Crunchyroll Anime Awards for Anime of the Year for the latter; all of which are the first two video game adaptations to win these major honors.

Animated shows

Japanese anime

Afterlost (2019)
Air (2005)
Arc the Lad (1999)
Ace Attorney (2016–2019)
Azur Lane (2019–present)
Bible Black (2003–2008)
Blue Dragon (2007–2009)
Bomberman B-Daman Bakugaiden (1998–1999)
Bomberman Jetters (2002–2003)
Canvas 2 (2005–2006)
Chaos;Head (2008)
Steins;Gate (2011)
Steins;Gate 0 (2015)
Clannad (2007–2008)
Clannad After Story (2008–2009)
Comic Party/Comic Party Revolution (2001, 2005)
Cyberpunk: Edgerunners (2022)
D.C. ~Da Capo~ (2003–2005)
Danganronpa: The Animation (2013)
Danganronpa 3: The End of Hope's Peak High School (2016)
Devil May Cry (2007)
Digimon (1997–present)
Digimon Adventure (2020–2021)
Dinosaur King (2007–2008)
Dragon Quest (1989–1991)
Dragon Quest: The Adventure of Dai (1991–1992)
Ef: A Tale of Memories. (2007)
Fate/stay night (2006)
Final Fantasy: Legend of the Crystals (1994) - A sequel to Final Fantasy V
Final Fantasy: Unlimited (2001–2002)
F-Zero: GP Legend (2003–2004)
Gakuen Heaven (2006)
Galaxy Angel (2001–2004)
Gungrave (2003–2004)
Harukanaru Toki no Naka de Hachiyō Shō (2004–2005)
Higurashi No Naku Koro Ni (2006–2007)
Higurashi When They Cry (2020–2021)
Hyperdimension Neptunia: The Animation (2013)
Inazuma Eleven (2008–2011)
The Idol Master (2011)
Kanon (2002, 2006–2007)
Rumbling Hearts (2003–2004)
The King of Fighters: Another Day (2005–2006)
Kiniro no Corda (2006–2014)
Kirby: Right Back at Ya! (2001–2003)
Koisuru Tenshi Angelique (2006–2008)
Layton Mystery Tanteisha: Katori no Nazotoki File (2018–2019)
The Legend of Heroes: Trails of Cold Steel – Northern War (2023)
Magical Girl Lyrical Nanoha series - Based on Triangle Hearts 3 Lyrical Toybox (2004–2016)
Medabots (1999–2001)
Mega Man NT Warrior (2002–2006)
Mega Man Star Force (2006–2008)
Mix Master (2005–2006)
Monster Rancher (1999–2001)
Nightwalker: The Midnight Detective (1998)
Pac-Man and the Ghostly Adventures (2013–2015)
Parappa the Rapper (2001–2002)
Persona
Persona: Trinity Soul (2008) - A spin-off of Persona 3
Persona 4: The Animation (2011–2012) & Persona 4: The Golden Animation (2014)
Persona 5: The Animation (2018–2019)
Pokémon (1997–present)
Pokémon Chronicles (2002–2004)
Power Stone (1999)
Resident Evil: Infinite Darkness (2021)
Sakura Wars (2000)
Saru Get You -On Air- (2006–2007)
School Days (2007–2008)
Sentimental Journey (1998)
Shenmue (2022)
Shuffle! (2005–2007)
Sister Princess (2001)
Sister Princess ~ RePure (2002)
Sonic X (2003–2005)
Star Ocean EX (2001) - Based on Star Ocean: The Second Story
Street Fighter II V (1995)
Suki na Mono wa Suki Dakara Shouganai (2005)
Taiko no Tatsujin (2005)
Tales
Tales of Eternia: The Animation (2001)
Tales of the Abyss: The Animation (2008–2009)
Tekken: Bloodline (2022)
ToHeart (1999)
ToHeart Remember my Memories (2004)
To Heart 2 (2005)
Tokimeki Memorial Only Love (2006–2007)
Tokyo Majin (2007)
The Tower of Druaga (2008–2009)
Tsukihime, Lunar Legend (2003)
Utawarerumono (2006)
Utawarerumono: The False Faces (2006–2009)
Viewtiful Joe (2004–2005)
Virtua Fighter (1995–1996)
Wild Arms: Twilight Venom (1999–2000)
Wind -a breath of heart- (2004)
Xenosaga: The Animation (2005)
Yo-Kai Watch (2014–present)
Ys (1989–1993)
Yumeria (2004)
Z.O.E. Dolores,i (2001) - Set within the Zone of the Enders universe

There have also been several one-off video game-based cartoons, including specials such as Bubsy (1993), Battletoads (1992) and Pokémon Mystery Dungeon (2006–2009).

International

Alien: Isolation – The Digital Series (2019) 
Angry Birds
Angry Birds Toons (2013–2016) F
Piggy Tales (2014–2018)
Angry Birds Stella (2014–2015) 
Angry Birds Blues (2017)
Angry Birds: Summer Madness (2022–present)
Ape Escape (2009)
Arcane (2021)
Captain N: The Game Master (1989–1991) 
Carmen Sandiego (2019–2021)
Castlevania (2017–2021)
Clash-A-Rama! (2016–present)
Costume Quest (2019–present)
The Cuphead Show! (2022–present)
Darkstalkers (1995)
Dishonored - Tales from Dunwall (2012) - three-part web series that serves as a prequel to the game.
Dofus (2013)
Dota: Dragon's Blood (2021)
Dragon Age: Absolution (2022)
Dragon's Dogma (2020) 
Donkey Kong Country (1997–2000)
Double Dragon (1993–1994)
Dragon's Lair (1984)
Earthworm Jim (1995–1996)
Fruit Ninja: Frenzy Force (2017) 
The Legend of Zelda (1989)
Legends of Dawn: The Sacred Stone (2021–present)
Meet the Team (2007–2012) (Web series)
Mega Man (1994)
Mega Man: Fully Charged (2018–2019)
Mortal Kombat: Defenders of the Realm (1996)
Mutant League (1994–1996)
Om Nom Stories (2012–present) 
Pac-Man (1982–1983)
Piggy Tales (2014–2019)
Pole Position (1984)
Rayman: The Animated Series (1999–2000)
Rabbids Invasion (2013–2017)
Saturday Supercade (1983–1984)
Skylanders Academy (2016–2018)
Sonic the Hedgehog
Adventures of Sonic the Hedgehog (1993)
Sonic the Hedgehog (1993–1994)
Sonic Underground (1999)
Sonic Boom (2014–2017)
Sonic Prime (2022)
Street Fighter (1995–1997)
Subway Surfers: The Animated Series (2018)
Super Mario
The Super Mario Bros. Super Show! (1989)
The Adventures of Super Mario Bros. 3 (1990)
Super Mario World (1991) 
Talking Tom and Friends 
Talking Friends (2012) 
Talking Tom & Friends (2014–present) 
Talking Tom Shorts (2014–present) 
Talking Tom and Friends Minis (2016–2018) 
Talking Tom Heroes (2019) 
Tak and the Power of Juju (2007–2009) - Game and television series were developed in tandem.
Twisted Metal: Black (2008) - Promotional webisodes. 
Viva Piñata (2006–2009)
Wakfu (2008–2017)
Where on Earth Is Carmen Sandiego? (1994–1999)
Wing Commander Academy (1996)

Upcoming 
Captain Lazerhawk: A Blood Dragon Vibe (TBA)
Castlevania: Nocturne (TBA)
Hungry Shark Squad (TBA)
Rayman (TBA)
Watch Dogs (TBA)

Animated and live-action shows

TV Shows
The Super Mario Bros. Super Show! (1989)

Live-action shows

Game shows
A*mazing (1994–1998)
Candy Crush (2017)
Frogger (2021)
Where in the World Is Carmen Sandiego? (1991–1995)
Where in Time is Carmen Sandiego? (1996–1997)
You Don't Know Jack (2001)

TV Shows
Cross Fire (2020)
Detention (2020)
Maniac Mansion (1990–1993)
Mortal Kombat: Conquest (1998–1999)
Halo (2022–present)
Higurashi When They Cry (2016)
Resident Evil (2022)
The Last of Us (2023–present)

Web series
Dragon Age: Redemption (2011)
Mortal Kombat: Legacy (2011–2013)
Halo 4: Forward Unto Dawn (2012)
Hay Day: Meet the Farmer! (2018–present)
Payday: The Web Series (2013)
Street Fighter: Assassin's Fist (2014)
Street Fighter: Resurrection (2016)
The Far Cry Experience (2013)

Upcoming
A Plague Tale (TBA)
Alan Wake (TBA)
Assassin's Creed (TBA)
Brothers in Arms (TBA)
Child of Light (TBA)
Disco Elysium (TBA)
Driver (TBA)
Fallout (TBA)
Final Fantasy (TBA)
God of War (TBA)
Horizon (TBA)
Hunt: Showdown (TBA)
Life Is Strange (TBA)
Mass Effect (TBA)
My Friend Pedro (TBA)
Untitled Pokémon series (TBA)
Skull & Bones (TBA)
Untitled Sonic the Hedgehog spin-off (2023)
Steins;Gate (TBA)
System Shock (TBA)
Twisted Metal (TBA)
Vampyr (TBA)

Series about video games

Aaron Stone (2009–2010) - A boy turns into his favorite online superhero
Accel World (2012) - A series about a boy who plays VR video games to escape bullies in school and discovers a secret program that is able to accelerate the human cognitive process to the point at which time appears to stop.
Ace Lightning (2002) - Children's television series centered on a teenage boy's life after his video game characters come to life.
Alice in Borderland (2020) – Series about a group of gamers trapped in a parallel dimension.
Arcadia (TV series) (2008–present) - Guatemalan TV series about video games
Arcade Gamer Fubuki (2002–2003)
Bad Influence! (1992-1996) - UK TV series aimed at a younger audience covering contemporary video games and technology
BOFURI: I Don't Want To Get Hurt, so I'll Max Out My Defense. (2020–present)
Breadwinners (2014–2016) – The Breadwinners "level up" like video game characters. 
Captain N: The Game Master (1989–1991) - Revolves around a kid who travels across various NES video games.
Close Enough (2020–2022) – Josh Singleton, the lead male protagonist, works as a video game developer.
Code Monkeys (2007–2008) - About the lives of video game programmers and animated to resemble and parody the tropes of 1980s 8 and 16 bit video games.
Crash Zone (1999–2001)
Da Boom Crew (2004)
Darwin's Game (2020–present)
Dead Pixels (2019–present) – Sitcom about online gaming. 
Deadly Games (1995) - plot centered on video game villains that have escaped into reality.
Defiance (2013–2015) – The series is connected with a video game of the same name.
Epic NPC Man (2016–present)
Fish Hooks (2010–2014) – Oscar, one of the main characters, is an avid gamer.
Future Man (2017–2020)
Game Center Arashi (1982)
GameCenter CX (2003–present)
Game Grumps (2012–present, web series) - Let's Play series centering around its hosts Dan Avidan and Arin Hanson playing video games while adding comedic commentary.
Game Grumps Animated
Game Grumps Vs
Guest Grumps
Steam Train
Game Over (2004) - TV series about the lives of video game characters after the game was over. Aired on UPN originally.
Game Shakers (2015–2019)
Gamer's Guide to Pretty Much Everything (2015–2017)
The Gamers: Shadow Dance (2017)
GamesMaster (1992–present)
Glitch Techs (2020) – Netflix/Nickelodeon animated series about a secret group of gamers who fight glitch monsters.
The Guild (2007–2013)
.hack
.hack//Sign (2002)
.hack//Legend of the Twilight (2003)
Harsh Realm (1999) - Hobbes,  soldier about to retire, is put into a virtual reality where the only way to get out alive and get back to his wife and the love of his life, is to kill Omar Santiago, another soldier in the game and has taken it over.
High Score Girl (2018–2019)
The Hollow (2018)
Infinite Dendrogram (2020)
Just One Smile Is Very Alluring (2016)
Kamen Rider Ex-Aid (2016–2017) - The 18th installment of the Heisei era Kamen Rider series. This show utilizes game cartridges called Rider Gashats and the rider's motifs inspired by retro video games.
The King's Avatar (2017–present)
The King's Avatar (2019) - live-action web series based on the web novel and anime series of the same name. 
King Koopa’s Kool Kartoons (1989–1990) - not actually based on a game, just a framing device for cartoons and toy giveaways.
Kiss Me First (2018)
Level Up (2012–2013)
Log Horizon (2013–2018) - The series follows the strategist, Shiroe, and the other players of the long-lived MMORPG Elder Tales after they find themselves whisked away into the game world following a game update.
Magic Micro Mission (1983) - UK TV series aimed at a younger audience covering contemporary video games and technology.
Memories of the Alhambra (2018–2019) - South Korean television series about an augmented reality game based on the Alhambra palace.
The Mighty Ducks: Game Changers (2021–) – Koob, a member of the Don't Bothers, is a gamer.
Mythic Quest: Raven's Banquet (2020–)
Nick Arcade (1992)
No Game No Life (2014)
The Ones Within (2019)
Overlord (2015–2018)- Japanese anime series about a VRMMO that is in the process of getting shut down but becomes real.
Parker Plays (2017–2018) - A Disney XD show featuring YouTube personality Parker Coppins, aka ParkerGames, playing video games, the series also features other YouTubers such as CaptainSparklez, Strawburry17, Shubble, and Steve Zaragoza, as well as Jimmy Wong and Whitney Moore.
Players (2022–) – Mockumentary about a fictional team of professional League of Legends gamers.
The Power Team (1990–1992) Featured various Acclaim Entertainment video game characters.
ReBoot (1994–2001) - The characters commonly assume the roles of enemy NPCs in "Game Cubes".
ReBoot: The Guardian Code (2018)
Russian Doll (2019–present) – Series about a game developer stuck in a time loop.
Slasher (2018–present) – In the third season, Solstice, one of the main characters, Amy Chao, is a professional gamer.
Sparta (2018)
Starcade (1982–1984) - Arcade game-based game show hosted by Geoff Edwards (with early episodes being hosted by Mark Richards) 
Sword Art Online (2012–present) - A series where players get trapped in a VRMMORPG (Virtual Reality Massively Multiplayer Online Game) named Sword Art Online.
The Tribe (1999–2003)- Series four focuses on tribes addicted to a virtual-reality game.
Tron: Uprising (2012–2013)
Video Power (1990–1992)
Video Game High School (2006–2009)
Video & Arcade Top 10 (1992–2008)
Virtual Insanity Advance (2012) - Sketch-comedy series centered on video games where people simulate popular and ancient corresponding video-games while interacting with real people and features short animated segments of cartoons based on popular video games.
Welcome to the N.H.K. (2006) – Tatsuhiro Sato, the lead male protagonist, works as a writer for gal games
Zixx (2004–2009)
Zomboat! (2019) – One of the main characters, an avid gamer, uses her gaming skills to survive a zombie apocalypse.

Series episodes with plots centered on video games

6Teen
Season 1 Episode 3: "The Slow and Even-Tempered" (2004) – Caitlin practices driving using a virtual driving game.
Season 4 Episode 4: "Blast from the Past" (2010) – Jude goes to the game store to purchase an old video game.
Season 4 Episode 5 "Quit It" (2010) – Jude goes to the game store to purchase a guitar game.
Season 4 Episode 8: "Great Expectations" (2010) – Jonesy and Jude hang out at the game store.
7th Heaven
Season 3 Episode 7: "Johnny Got His Gun" (1998) – Ruth wants to buy a violent video game. 
Adventures in Odyssey
Season 2 Episode 2: Escape From The Forbidden Matrix (2001) - Dylan and his friend get trapped inside a video game world.
All Grown Up!
Season 1 Episode 8: "River Rats" (2003) – Betty takes the kids rafting to help Phil overcome his video game addiction.
 The Amazing World of Gumball
 Season 5 Episode 18: The Console (2017) - When Gumball is given a cursed video game console, Elmore gets trapped inside a fantasy RPG world.
American Horror Stories
Season 1 Episode 7: "Game Over" (2021) – A video game programmer attempts to adapt American Horror Story into a video game.
Animaniacs
Season 2 Episode 1: "Wakko's Short Shorts: Now Loading" (2021) – Wakko waits for a game to load.
Season 3 Episode 8: "WARnerGAMES" (2023) – The Warners get trapped inside a video game.
Are You Afraid of the Dark?
Season 1 Episode 13: "Tale of the Pinball Wizard" (1992) – A teenage plays a supernatural pinball game.
 The Barbarian and the Troll
 Season 1 Episode 11: "I Will Survive" (2021) – The Questers play a dance game in order to enter a demon's lair.
Beetlejuice
Season 4 Episode 25 "Vidiots": (1991) – Beetlejuice and Lydia get sucked into a video game.
Bibleman
Season 3 Episode 5: "Blasting The Big Gamemaster Bully" (2009) – The villain Super Pro Gamemaster 2 creates a video game that influences children to become bullies.
The Big Bang Theory
Season 2 Episode 3: "The Barbarian Sublimation" (2008) – Sheldon gets Penny addicted to an online game.
Big City Greens
Season 1 Episode 16: "Cyberbullies" (2018) – Cricket deals with bullies he encountered from an online game.
Season 3 Episode 29: "Virtually Christmas" (2022) – The Greens spend Christmas inside a video game.
Black-ish
Season 6 Episode 8: "O Mother Where Art Thou" (2019) – Junior gets Rainbow hooked on a video game.
Black Mirror
Season 3 Episode 2: "Playtest" (2016) - An American traveler short on cash signs up to test a revolutionary new gaming system.
Castle
Season 7 Episode 3: "Clear & Present Danger" (2014) – An underground gamer is suspected of being the accessory of an invisible killer.
Chucky
Season 1 Episode 2: "Give Me Something Good to Eat" (2021) – Chucky plays video games with Lexy's sister.
Clerks: The Animated Series
Season 1 Episode 5: "Dante and Randall..." (2002) – Randall is put into slave labor after beating the high score on an old video game.
Cobra Kai
Season 4 Episode 2: "First Learn Stand" (2022) – Kenny Payne, a new student, is heavily into a fantasy video game.
Season 4 Episode 7: "Minefields" (2022) – Danny uses video game metaphors to explain Karate to his son Anthony.
Con Man
Season 1 Episode 8: "Voiced Over" (2015) – Wray Nerely provides voice-work for a video game.
The Conners
Season 4 Episode 6: "Peter Pan, the Backup Plan, Adventures in Babysitting and A River Runs Through It" (2021) – Dan and Luiz play a virtual reality game.
CSI: Cyber
Season 1 Episode 11: "Ghost in the Machine" (2015) – The team investigates a death involving a video game.
CSI: Miami
Season 3 Episode 20: "Game Over" (2005) - A skateboarder and video game tester is found murdered in a car accident. Tony Hawk is in this episode.
Season 4 Episode 9: "Urban Hellraisers" (2007) - Murders are being committed in a style similar to a Grand Theft Auto-like game.
CSI: NY
Season 4 Episode 5: "Down The Rabbit Hole" (2007) - Centers around a murder via Second Life.
Community
Season 3, Episode 20: "Digital Estate Planning" (2012) - The Greendale 7 must help Pierce attain his father's fortune by playing an 8-bit video game.
Corner Gas Animated
Season 2 Episode 10: "Anger Games" (2019) – Wanda creates a video game.
Craig of the Creek
Season 1 Episode 27: "Power Punchers" (2018) – Craig trains after getting fed up with losing to his father at video games.
Season 4 Episode 11: "Chrono Moss" (2022) – Craig and his friends come upon a village with video game references.
Creeped Out
Season 2 Episode 1: "One More Minute" (2019) – A gamer suffers memory loss.
Danger 5
Season 2 Episode 2: "Johnny Hitler" (2015) – Tucker and Mendes engage in a Street Fighter II-like fight. 
Daria
Season 2 Episode 7: "The New Kid" (1998) – Daria and a new friend play a virtual reality arcade game.
Dave the Barbarian
Season 1 Episode 3: "Ned Frischman: Man of Tomorrow" (2004) – A nerd from the future gets the people of Udrogoth hooked on video games.
Diff'rent Strokes
Season 5 Episode 1: "Shoot-Out at the O.K. Arcade" (1982) – Arnold and Willis compete in a video game.
Doug
Season 2 Episode 13: "Doug's Lost Weekend" (1992) – Doug gets distracted by a new video game.
Drake & Josh
Season 2 Episode 1: "The Bet" (2004) – Drake and Josh make a bet they can go without junk food and video games.
Dude, That's My Ghost!
Season 1 Episode 8: "Axe Maniac" (2013) – Spencer gets hooked on a haunted video game.
Emmanuelle in Space
Season 1 Episode 7: "Emmanuelle 7: The Meaning of Love" (1994) – Emmanuelle uses virtual reality computer simulations to help her clients achieve sexual ecstasy.
Even Stevens
Season 1 Episode 10: "Easy Way" (2000) – Louis's friends and family have fun at a video arcade called "Funtasia."
Evil
Season 1 Episode 4: "Rose390" (2019) – Kristen's daughters play with a digital game that may be possessed.
Season 1 Episode 11: "Room 320" (2020) – Ben uses a digital game to track down a psychopath.
The Fairly OddParents
Season 1 Episode 1b: "Power Mad!" (2001) - Timmy utilizes a virtual reality helmet to play a video game he wished for as "challenging, a game that you can’t wish yourself out of". A.J. and Chester use the helmets to play the game as well, not realizing they are in mortal danger.
The Fairly OddParents: Fairly Odder
Season 1 Episode 12: "Fairies Away! Pt.1" (2022) – Roy wishes for a life-like virtually reality game.
Season 1 Epsideo 13: "Fairies Away Pt. 2" (2022) – Roy uses a virtual reality game to rescue Viv. 
Fangbone!
Season 1 Episode 16: "The Kat of Munching" (2017) – Fangbone gets addicted to a video game.
Forbidden Science
Season 1 Episode 10: "Virus" (2009) – Penny plays a sexy virtual reality game.
Forever Knight
Season 3 Episode 15: "Games Vampires Play" (1996) - Nick investigates the death of a software designer whose murderer actually puts clues into the vampire game the designer created. Nick plays the game (which is erasing itself while being played) and finds his vampire tendencies being strengthened by the actions of the vampire character. He also finds the clues that lead to the murderer... in a church!
Fresh Off the Boat
Season 1 Episode 6: "Fajita Man" (2015) – Eddie takes a job at Cattleman's Ranch to buy a video game.
Friends
Season 8 Episode 12: "The One Where Joey Dates Rachel" (2002) – Phoebe buys Chandler and Monica the Ms. Pac-Man arcade game as a late wedding present.
Futurama
Season 4 Episode 3: "Anthology of Interest II" (2001) - In the segment Raiders of the Lost Arcade, Fry sees a simulation of life as it would be if it were more like a video game.
Season 6 Episode 26: "Reincarnation" (2011) - The segment Future Challenge 3000 is animated to resemble a video game.
Ghostforce
Season 1 Episode 9: "Zipzap" (2022) – A ghost takes control of a video game.
The Goldbergs
Season 5 Episode 7: "A Wall Street Thanksgiving" (2017) – Adam Goldberg purchases an E.T. video game.
Season 6 Episode 19: "8-Bit Goldbergs" (2019) – Adam creates a video game based on his family.
Gravity Falls
Season 1 Episode 10: "Fight Fighters" (2012) – Dipper unleashes a video game fighter.
The Grim Adventures of Billy & Mandy
 Season 1 Episode 10: "Night of the Living Grim" (2003) – Billy plays a slime-eating video game. 
The Haunting Hour: The Series
Season 1 Episode 9: "Game Over"- Gamers are zapped into a video game and fight for survival.
Head of the Class
Season 3 Episode 20: "King of Remedial" (1989) – At an academic tournament, a remedial student uses video game references to answer the final question.
Home Improvement
Season 1 Episode 13: "Up Your Alley" (1992) – Randy Taylor and a bully fight over the arcade game Zaxxon.
Hotel Transylvania: The Series
Season 2 Episode 8: "The Northern Frights" (2019) – Uncle Gene becomes obsessed with gaming.
iCarly
Season 2 Episode 2: "iStage an Intervention" (2008) – Carly and friends help Spencer overcome his addiction to video games.
I Know What You Did Last Summer
Season 1 Episode 1: "It's Thursday" (2015) – Dylan plays Mortal Kombat at a party.
Intergalactic
Season 1 Episode 7 "Episode 7" (2021) – Drew and Genevieve play a dance game.
The IT Crowd
Season 4 Episode 4: "Italian for Beginners" (2010) – Moss gets trapped inside a claw crane game at a video arcade.
Jellystone!
Season 1 Episode 9 : "Gotta Kiss Them All" (2021) – Augie and Yakky play a new VR game.
Johnny Bravo
Season 3 Episode 2: "Virtual Johnny" (2000) – Johnny tests a virtual reality game.
Johnny Test
Season 6 Episode 25: "Johnny Goes Gaming" (2014) – Johnny and Dukey get trapped inside a video game.
Kickin' It
Season 2 Episode 11: "Kim of Kong" (2012) – Jack and Kim compete in a video game battle.
King of the Hill
Season 6 Episode 22: "Returning Japanese Part 2" (2002) – In Japan, Bobby Hill plays a step-dancing game with a crush.
Kirby Buckets
Season 1 Episode 8: "Kirby's Choice" (2015) – Kirby wins tickets to a video game convention.
Last Man Standing
Season 8 Episode 6: "Mysterious Ways" (2020) – Vanessa accidentally knocks down her kids' virtual reality game.
Law & Order: Criminal Intent
Season 3 Episode 10: "F.P.S." (2004) - A gamer, who appears to be connected to a network of thieves using spyware to commit fraud, is murdered.
Law & Order: Special Victims Unit
Season 6 Episode 14: "Game" (2005) - Teenagers run down a prostitute. They seem to be acting out a violent video game.
Season 9 Episode 2: "Avatar" (2007) - Centers around an online game similar to Second Life.
Life with Derek
Season 1 Episode 11: "Babe Raider" (2005) – Casey catches Derek playing a sexist video game.
The Loud House
Season 3 Episode 34: "Game Boys" (2018) – Clyde gets unhinged when Lincoln borrows his gaming system.
Man Up!
Season 1 Episode 9: "Camping" (2011) – The guys camp out by a department store for a video game.
M.I. High
Season 1 Episode 5: "Nerd Alert" (2007) – The spies use a friend's gaming skills to thwart a hacker.
Miraculous: Tales of Ladybug & Cat Noir
Season 1 Episode 22: "Gamer" (2016) - When Max loses a challenge at a video game tournament, he gets akumatized into the Gamer and unleashes a giant robot onto Paris.
Season 3 Episode 16: "Gamer 2.0" (2019) - When he cannot find anyone to test his video game that pits formerly akumatized villains against one another, Max again becomes one himself: Gamer 2.0.
Mixed-ish
Season 1 Episode 13: "Pride (In the Name of Love)" (2020) – Rainbow and her friends ditch school and go to a video arcade.
Muppet Babies
Season 7 Episode 1: "It's Only Pretendo" (1989) – Gonzo and Piggy compete in a video game.
 Ninjago
Season 12 Episode 12: "Stop, Drop and Side Scroll" (2020) – They are inside a video game and has to use video game knowledge to survive. They're in a platformer and sometimes we see them on the screen of a game Unit. The whole season is about video, but this one is most.
Phineas and Ferb
Season 2 Episode 11: "Gaming the System" (2009) – Buford plays a game called "Jump N' Duck", where all he has to do to beat the game is to jump and duck.
Season 2 Episode 62: "Brain Drain" (2010) – Phineas, Ferb and the gang are about to play a Street Fighter II-like video game.
Quack Pack
Season 1 Episode 4: "All Hands on Duck" (1996) – Donald's video game takes control of a remote-control navy plane.
The Really Loud House
Season 1 Episode 2: "The Chore Thing" (2022) – Lincoln plans to skip chore day to play a VR beach game.
Red Dwarf
Season 2 Episode 2: "Better Than Life" (1988) - The crew play a total immersion video game that grants the user's deepest wishes. Rimmer's self-loathing leads to manifestations of his subconscious fears.
Season 5 Episode 6 "Back to Reality" (1992) -  Exposure to a hallucinogenic toxin leads the crew to believe that the past four years of their lives were spent playing a total immersion video game. Seemingly back on Earth, they struggle to adapt to their "true" selves.
Season 6 Episode 3: "Gunmen of the Apocalypse" (1993) - The crew use a western-themed virtual reality game to enter Kryten's computer virus-induced dream.
Regular Show
Season 1 Episode 5: "Death Punchies" (2010) - While playing a new Dig Dug-like two-player video game with Mordecai, Rigby expresses his resentment at always having to be "Player Two" due to his poor video game-playing skills.
Season 2 Episode 7: "High Score" (2011) - After beating the world record high score at an Excitebike-like arcade game, Mordecai and Rigby find themselves competing for the 'universe record'.
Season 2 Episode 8: "Rage Against the TV" (2011) - Mordecai's and Rigby's TV stops working just as they reach the final stage of the Double Dragon-like video game they have been playing for 20 hours straight, and locating another one (so that they can beat "The Hammer") proves difficult.
Season 3 Episode 19: "Video Game Wizards" (2012) - Mordecai, Rigby and Skips take part in a video game tournament in order to win a specialty game controller (based on the Power Glove peripheral for the Nintendo Entertainment System).
Rick and Morty
Season 2 Episode 2: Mortynight Run (2015) – Rick plays the arcade game Blips & Chitz.
Season 6 Episode 2: "Rick: A Mort Well Lived" (2022) – Morty gets trapped in a VR game.
Robotech
Season 1 Episode 24: "Showdown" (1985) – While infiltrating the SF-D1, Miriya plays games at a video arcade.
Round the Twist
Season 3 Episode 4: "You Am I" (2000) - A video game causes Pete Twist and Mr. Gribbles to switch bodies.
Sanjay and Craig
Season 1 Episode 8: "Game On" (2013) – Sanjay and Craig's favorite video game disappears at the Frycade.
Seinfeld
"Season 9 Episode 18: The Frogger" (1998) - At Mario's Pizza Parlor, George Costanza discovers he still has the high score on the old Frogger video game he played in high school, with a score of 860,630 points. He decides to buy the Frogger machine to preserve his fame, but Jerry asks him how he is going to move it and keep it plugged in to preserve the high score.
Side Hustle
Season 2 Episode 8: "A Mouth Noise Christmas" (2021) – Alan and Tedward search for a recalled video game.
Season 2 Episode 17: "Dinner for Jerks" (2022) – Fischer creates a video game.
The Simpsons
Season 7 Episode 11: Marge Be Not Proud (1995) – Bart is caught stealing a video game.
Season 18 Episode 17: Marge Gamer (2007) – Marge Simpson participates in online gaming.
Season 30 Episode 17: "E My Sports" (2019) – Bart competes in a video game tournament.
Season 34 Episode 10: "Game Done Changed" (2022) – Marge communicates with Maggie through a video game.
Spicy City
Season 1 Episode 1: "Love is a Download" (1997) – Two lovers meet in a virtual-reality game world.
So Weird
Season 1 Episode 5: "Escape" (1999) – The kids visit a carnival video arcade while dealing with a girl with astral projection powers.
Season 3 Episode 6: "Banglebye" (2000) – Small town kids are hypnotized by a video game.
South Park
Season 10 Episode 8: "Make Love, Not Warcraft" (2006) - A griefer named Jenkins repeatedly kills the South Park boys' characters in the online game World of Warcraft.
Season 11 Episode 13: "Guitar Queer-O" (2007) - This episode is centered on Guitar Hero.
Season 17 Episode 2: "Informative Murder Porn" (2013) - This episode is centered on the parents learning to play Minecraft in order to get their murder porn back.
Spaceballs: The Animated Series
Season 1 Episode 2: "Grand Theft Starship" (2008) - Captain Lone Starr and Princess Vespa are sucked into a game of 'Grand Theft Starship', leaving the Spaceballs to conquer the known universe. But, missing Lone Starr's opposition, President Skroob and Dark Helmet follow them into the game world.
Star Trek: The Next Generation
Season 5 Episode 6: "The Game" (1991) - Ktarians attempt mind control on the crew of the Enterprise with an addictive holographic video game.
Stargate SG-1
Season 8 Episode 6: "Avatar" (2004) - Teal'c becomes trapped a virtual reality training simulator.
Stoked
Season 2 Episode 2: "Surf Surf Revolution" (2010) – Reef creates a surfing video game.
The Super Dimension Fortress Macross
Season 1 Episode 24: "Good-bye Girl" (1983) – Max and Milia meet at a video arcade.
Superstore
Season 3 Episode 13: "Video Game Release" (2018) – A new video games is released in Cloud 9.
Todd and the Book of Pure Evil
Season 2 Episode 6: "Fisting Fantasy" (2011) – Todd and his friends are trapped in a video game.
Total DramaRama
Season 3 Episode 22: "Teacher, Soldier, Chef, Spy" (2021) – Chef creates a VR game.
Tucker
Season 1 Episode 3: "Everybody Dance Now" (2000) – Tucker tries to impress McKenna by attempting to beat a dancing arcade game.
The X-Files
Season 7 Episode 13: "First Person Shooter" (2000) - The Lone Gunmen summon Mulder and Scully to a virtual reality firm when the new game they have helped design is thwarted by a bizarre female computer character whose power is much more than virtual.
Young Dylan
Season 3 Episode 7: "Fame, Blame & Video Games" (2022) – Dylan and Rebecca compete in a gaming competition.
Young Sheldon
Season 2 Episode 8: "An 8-Bit Princess and a Flat Tire Genius" (2018) – Meemaw and Sheldon get addicted to a video game console.

See also
List of anime based on video games
List of films based on video games

References

 List
Video games, List of television programs based on
Television programs based on video games, List of